The Jubbulpore Division, named after its capital Jabalpur (Jubbulpore), was one of the four former administrative divisions of the Central Provinces of British India. It was located in the Mahakoshal region of present-day Madhya Pradesh state of India. The Jubbulpore Division had an area of 48,401 km² with a population of 2,201,633 in 1881.

The Central Provinces became the Central Provinces and Berar in 1936 until the Independence of India.

History
Immediately after occupation of the area around Jubbulpore the British authorities established a provisional administration under the superintendent of Political Affairs of Bundelkhand. In 1820 a division containing 12 districts was formed which was known as the Agency of the Saugor and Nerbudda Territories. This new division was placed under an agent of the general governor at Jubbulpore.  

Jubbulpore Division was established in 1861 when the Saugor and Nerbudda Territories were merged with Nagpur Province, which the British had annexed in 1853, in order to form the Central Provinces.

Territory
There were 11 towns and 8501 villages in the Jubbulpore Division. After the Independence of India it became the Jabalpur division of the state of Madhya Pradesh.

Districts
The Jubbulpore Division included the following districts:
Sagar (Saugor)
Damoh
Jabalpur (Jubbulpore)
Mandla
Seoni

See also
Central Provinces, Administration
Saugor and Nerbudda Territories

References

Further reading
 McEldowney, Philip F. (1980). Colonial Administration and Social Developments in middle India: The Central Provinces, 1861-1921. Ph. D. Dissertation.

Divisions of British India
States and territories established in 1853
1861 establishments in British India
ca:Divisió de Jabalpur